Elisabeth Williams-Omilami (born February 18, 1951) is an American human rights activist and an actress.

Life and career
Born in Atlanta, Williams-Omilami is the daughter of activist Hosea Williams and Georgia State Representative Juanita T. Williams. Williams-Omilami young life was spent with the Civil Rights Movement of the 1950s, 1960s and 1970s. After graduating from college, she created the People's Survival Theatre, producing a season of five shows per year. People's Survival Theatre continued to produce shows long after Williams-Omilami's journey to New York City when her husband Afemo Omilami received a scholarship to New York University. In New York, Williams-Omilami worked as an arts administrator and executive assistant. Williams-Omilami directed and acted as much as she could, supporting her family as her husband's career grew. In 1985, Williams-Omilami left New York to return to Atlanta. While in Atlanta Williams-Omilami continued to perform on stage and in film and television. Williams-Omilami graduated from Hampton University with a BA in Theatre.

Activism

Williams-Omilami's parents brought her along on Civil Rights marches and movements across the South since she was young. During the height of the Civil Rights Movement, Williams-Omilami attended boarding school to Wasatch Academy in Utah where she was the only African-American student. Williams-Omilami had worked for over 15 years in the background of her father's Hosea Feed The Hungry and Homeless efforts, and upon his passing in November 2000 became the organization's CEO, expanding the organization from a budget of $200,000 to over $1.5 million. Williams-Omilami worked to provide programs that would meet the basic needs of the working poor and homeless along a continuum of care leading to self-sufficiency. Williams-Omilami expanded these programs from four months to year-round services and established medical clinics, clothing distribution, barber and beautician services, children's educational programs, and home delivery of over 22,000 dinners per year. Williams-Omilami has spoken and toured worldwide for several international relief efforts in places like the Philippines, where she has founded and operates a school for the underprivileged children of Mindanou, and Haiti and Uganda, where she sponsors several orphanages.

Williams-Omilami has been acknowledged many times for her humanitarian service. Honorary membership induction into Zeta Phi Beta sorority, A Georgia State Senate Resolution in recognition of her community service, Atlanta Business League 100 Women of Influence, For Sisters Only, Women In Film Humanitarian Award, Secretary of State of Georgia Outstanding Citizen, State of Georgia Goodwill Ambassador, YWCA Women of Achievement Academy, Burger King Urban Everyday Heroes, Kraft Community Service; Southern Christian Leadership Conference Women Drum Major for Justice, T. D. Jakes Phenomenal Woman, Daughters of Isis Community Service Award, the Emory University M.L.K. Community Service Award and The National Conference of Black Mayors Fannie Lou Hamer Unsung Heroine Award.

Theatre and film

Williams-Omilami founded of one of Atlanta's earliest theatre companies People's Survival Theater, as well as the "Summer Artscamp", providing arts programming for economically challenged youth for over 7 years. Williams-Omilami is a playwright has written several plays, one of which is There Is A River In My Soul. She is a past member of both the Georgia Council For The Arts and the Fulton County Arts Council and is a passionate advocate for the arts to be instituted as permanent part of society. She is an actress and has performed at the Alliance Theatre in A Christmas Carol and in early 2002 in Left Hand Singing at the Jewish Theatre of The South. She can also be seen in the HBO made-for-television movie Boycott, In the Heat of the Night and the award-winning I'll Fly Away.

References

External links
Atlanta Women's Network. (2006). About Elisabeth Omilami. Retrieved 2007-06-12 from https://web.archive.org/web/20060622074632/http://www.atlantawomensnetwork.org/Speakers/06JulyElisabethOmilami.html

Official Website of Hosea Feed The Hungry and Homeless

1951 births
African-American actresses
Activists for African-American civil rights
20th-century American dramatists and playwrights
American film actresses
American humanitarians
Women humanitarians
American stage actresses
American television actresses
Living people
Actresses from Atlanta
21st-century American actresses
20th-century American actresses
Women civil rights activists
20th-century African-American women writers
20th-century American women writers
20th-century African-American writers
21st-century African-American women
21st-century African-American people